This article is about the particular significance of the year 1979 to Wales and its people.

Incumbents

Secretary of State for Wales – John Morris (until 5 May); Nicholas Edwards
Archbishop of Wales – Gwilym Williams, Bishop of Bangor
Archdruid of the National Eisteddfod of Wales – Geraint

Events
1 March - The devolution referendum rejects the Wales Act 1978 (which would have established a Welsh Assembly) by four to one. The Parliamentary Select Committee on Welsh Affairs is subsequently established.
18 May - Annie Powell of Rhondda becomes Britain's first Communist mayor.
7 June - In the elections for the European Parliament, Ann Clwyd and Win Griffiths are among the newly elected MEPs.  Plaid Cymru win no seats.
8 June - A Cessna aircraft crashes into a mountain in Snowdonia, killing all six occupants.
12 December - Four holiday homes in rural Wales are the target of arson attacks by Welsh Nationalist political activists.

Arts and literature

Awards
Michael Bogdanov is named "Director of the Year" for the Royal Shakespeare Company production of The Taming of the Shrew.
National Eisteddfod of Wales (held in Caernarfon)
National Eisteddfod of Wales: Chair - withheld
National Eisteddfod of Wales: Crown - Meirion Evans
National Eisteddfod of Wales: Prose Medal - Robyn Lewis

New books

English language
Gillian Clarke - The Sundial
Wendy Davies - The Llandaff Charters
Christopher Evans - The Mighty Micro
Emyr Humphreys - The Best of Friends
Sian James - A Small Country
Tristan Jones - The Incredible Voyage
Anna Kashfi - Brando for Breakfast
Leslie Norris - Sliding
Gwyn Alf Williams - The Merthyr Rising
Raymond Williams - The Fight for Manod

Welsh language
Pennar Davies - Mabinogi Mwys
Marion Eames - I Hela Cnau
Dic Jones - Storom Awst
John Rowlands - Tician, Tician

Music
Dave Edmunds - Repeat When Necessary (album)
Bonnie Tyler - Diamond Cut (album)

Film
Rachel Roberts wins the BAFTA award for Best Supporting Actress for her role in Yanks.
Emlyn Williams' play, The Corn is Green, is filmed for the second time, starring Katharine Hepburn.
A full-scale model of the fictional starship Millennium Falcon is constructed by Marcon Fabrications in the Western Sunderland Flying Boat hangar at Pembroke Dock for the film The Empire Strikes Back (1980).

Broadcasting
BBC Radio Cymru is launched.
New Home Secretary William Whitelaw rejects the idea of a Welsh fourth channel on behalf of the Conservative government.

English-language television
Colin Jeavons stars in Dennis Potter's classic play, Blue Remembered Hills.

Sport
BBC Wales Sports Personality of the Year – Terry Griffiths
Boxing - Pat Thomas wins the British Light-middleweight title
Rugby union - Wales win the Five Nations Championship and take the Triple Crown.
Snooker - Terry Griffiths wins the World Championship in his first year as a professional.

Births
15 February – Josh Low, footballer
21 February – Laura Anne Jones AM, politician
26 February – Steve Evans, footballer
15 April - Luke Evans, actor
17 May – Michaela Breeze, weightlifting champion
3 June – Christian Malcolm, athlete
13 July – Craig Bellamy, footballer
1 August- Honeysuckle Weeks, actress
8 August – Danny Gabbidon, footballer
Jonathan Edwards, poet

Deaths
January – Dilys Cadwaladr, poet, 76
7 February – Charles Tunnicliffe, painter on Anglesey, 77
13 February – Eric Newton Griffith-Jones, Welsh-descended lawyer, 65
13 March – Tudor Owen, actor, 81
15 April (in Surrey) – Eiluned Lewis, novelist, 78
14 May – Jean Rhys, novelist, 88
9 June – John Morris, Baron Morris of Borth-y-Gest, judge, 82
16 July – Harold Finch, politician, 81
30 August – C. E. Wynn-Williams, physicist, 76
2 September – Ewan Davies, rugby player, 92
10 October (in Teddington) – Christopher Evans, computer scientist, 48
12 October – Jackie Williams, footballer, 76
November – Ursula Williams, politician, 83
12 December – Goronwy Rees, writer, 70?
20 December – Leslie Gilbert Illingworth, political cartoonist, 77
21 December – Nansi Richards, harpist, 91
29 December – Richard Tecwyn Williams, biochemist, 70
date unknown
Hugh Bevan, academic
Dilys Davies, actress
Trebor Lloyd Evans, writer
Jennie Thomas, children's author
probable – William Evans, rugby player, about 88

See also
1979 in Northern Ireland

References

Wales
 Wales